Mount Foster is a peak rising to  in the Imeon Range on Smith Island in the South Shetland Islands, Antarctica. It is the highest point of the South Shetland Islands archipelago.
Mount Foster has triple peaks of which Mount Foster proper is the southernmost, the central one is Evlogi Peak (2090 m), and the northern one is Antim Peak (2070 m).  The first ascent was made by Greg Landreth and team on 29 January 1996.

The feature is named after Captain Henry Foster, commander of HMS Chanticleer who explored the South Shetlands in 1829.

Location

Mount Foster is linked by Zavet Saddle to Slaveykov Peak to the southwest and surmounts Bistra Glacier to the west, Chuprene Glacier to the north-northwest, Rupite Glacier to the east, Landreth Glacier to the southeast and Dragoman Glacier to the south-southeast.  The peak is located 5.45 km northeast of Riggs Peak, 2.78 km south-southeast of Garmen Point, 7.64 km southwest of Mount Pisgah and 3.86 km north-northwest of Ivan Asen Point (Bulgarian mapping in 2009).

Maps
Chart of South Shetland including Coronation Island, &c. from the exploration of the sloop Dove in the years 1821 and 1822 by George Powell Commander of the same. Scale ca. 1:200000. London: Laurie, 1822.
  L.L. Ivanov. Antarctica: Livingston Island and Greenwich, Robert, Snow and Smith Islands. Scale 1:120000 topographic map. Troyan: Manfred Wörner Foundation, 2010.  (First edition 2009. )
 South Shetland Islands: Smith and Low Islands. Scale 1:150000 topographic map No. 13677. British Antarctic Survey, 2009.
 Antarctic Digital Database (ADD). Scale 1:250000 topographic map of Antarctica. Scientific Committee on Antarctic Research (SCAR). Since 1993, regularly upgraded and updated.
 L.L. Ivanov. Antarctica: Livingston Island and Smith Island. Scale 1:100000 topographic map. Manfred Wörner Foundation, 2017.

See also
 List of Ultras of Antarctica
 Imeon Range
 Smith Island

References

Other sources

 Composite Gazetteer of Antarctica: Mount Foster
 "Mount Foster, Antarctica" on Peakbagger

External links
 Mount Foster. Copernix satellite image

Mountains of Smith Island (South Shetland Islands)